The English Baroque Choir was formed in 1978 and has become one of London's finest amateur choirs, developing a reputation for musicality, imaginative programming and choral enthusiasm. As its name suggests, the choir's spiritual home is in the rich music of the Baroque period, with large-scale works by Bach, Handel and Monteverdi regularly appearing in its programmes. However, it is equally at ease with repertoire from the 15th century right through to the present day – commissioning and giving the world premiere of Psalm-Cantata by John McCabe CBE in 2013 –  and frequently presents smaller-scale concerts  with keyboard, harp, brass or completely a cappella.

Musical Director 
Since 2022 the choir is led by prize-winning conductor and choral director Harry Bradford. Harry recently graduated, with distinction, from the Royal Academy of Music where he studied for an MMus Degree under Patrick Russill and was awarded both the Academy Alumni Scholarship and the prestigious DipRAM award for an outstanding final recital. He has also participated in masterclasses with Paul Brough (BBC Singers), Simon Halsey, David Hill, Neil Ferris, Mats Nilsson and Roland Börger. Alongside his commitments at the academy, Harry was the Genesis Sixteen Conducting Scholar 2018-19 receiving mentoring from Harry Christophers and Eamonn Dougan and the Alec Robertson Scholar at Westminster Cathedral. Recent career highlights include conducting the Swedish Radio Choir and winning the Second Prize in the prestigious ‘Eric Ericson Award’ 2021, working as Chorus Master at the St Endellion Easter Festival for the world premiere of Oliver Tarney's St Mark Passion and assisting Harry Christophers for the London premiere of Sir James McMillan's 5th Symphony.

Previous Musical Directors 
The choir was founded in 1978 under the direction of conductor Leon Lovett, who remained musical director for 22 years.

Between 2000 and 2021 the choir was led by Jeremy Jackman, renowned choral director, composer, arranger, and former member of the King's Singers.

The choir performs mainly in London, in venues including St John's Smith Square, St Martin-in-the-Fields and St James's Church, Piccadilly. It also travels throughout the home counties and Europe, having performed in Belgium, France, Germany, Italy, the Netherlands and Poland.

External links
 English Baroque Choir website

Early music choirs
English choirs
Musical groups established in 1978